Karin Kschwendt and Rene Simpson won in the final 6–2, 0–6, 6–4 against Laura Golarsa and Linda Harvey-Wild.

Seeds
Champion seeds are indicated in bold text while text in italics indicates the round in which those seeds were eliminated.

n/a
 Laura Golarsa /  Linda Harvey-Wild (final)
 Silvia Farina /  Nancy Feber (semifinals)
n/a
 Alexia Dechaume-Balleret /  Florencia Labat (semifinals)

Draw

External links
 1995 Puerto Rico Open Doubles draw

Puerto Rico Open (tennis)
1995 WTA Tour